The 2002 United States Senate election in West Virginia  was held on November 5. Incumbent Democratic U.S. Senator Jay Rockefeller won re-election to a fourth term, defeating Republican Jay Wolfe.

Major candidates

Democratic 
 Jay Rockefeller, incumbent U.S. Senator

Republican 
 Jay Wolfe, State Senator and nominee for U.S. Senate for 1988

Campaign 
Wolfe ran a Grassroots campaign. Rockefeller was the heavy favorite. Rockefeller had $2.9 million cash on hand to Wolfe at $100,536 (In mid-October). Wolfe was endorsed by President George W. Bush and the National Rifle Association, but it wasn't enough to make the election competitive.

Predictions

Results

See also 
 2002 United States Senate elections

References 

2002 West Virginia elections
West Virginia
2002